The Bath in the Barn is a 1943 German comedy film directed by Volker von Collande and starring Will Dohm, Heli Finkenzeller and Richard Häussler.

The film is shot in Agfacolor, one of only a few German films made in colour during the war years. The film's sets were designed by the art directors Gabriel Pellon and Franz F. Fürst.

It was remade in 1956 under the same title.

Plot

Cast

References

Bibliography

External links 
 

1943 films
1940s historical comedy films
Films of Nazi Germany
1940s German-language films
Films directed by Volker von Collande
Films set in the 17th century
Films set in Flanders
German historical comedy films
Tobis Film films
German black-and-white films
1943 comedy films
1940s German films